The 1979 Mutual Benefit Life Open, also known as the South Orange Open, was a men's tennis tournament played on outdoor clay courts at the Orange Lawn Tennis Club in South Orange, New Jersey in the United States. The event was part of the 1979 Grand Prix circuit. It was the tenth edition of the tournament and was held from July 30 through August 5, 1979. First-seeded John McEnroe won the  singles title and earned $13,000 first-prize money.

Finals

Singles
 John McEnroe defeated  John Lloyd 6–7(1–7), 6–4, 6–0
 It was McEnroe' 6th singles title of the year and the 11th of his career.

Doubles
 John McEnroe /  Peter Fleming defeated  Fritz Buehning /  Bruce Nichols 6–1, 6–3

References

External links
 ITF tournament edition details

South Orange Open
South Orange Open
South Orange Open
South Orange Open
South Orange Open
Tennis tournaments in New Jersey
South Orange Open